Schleching is a municipality and a village in Traunstein district in Bavaria, Germany.

References

Traunstein (district)